

List of Colonial Heads of Guinea

(Dates in italics indicated de facto continuation of office)

For continuation after independence, see: Presidents of Guinea

See also
Guinea
Heads of State of Guinea
Heads of Government of Guinea
Lists of incumbents

History of Guinea
Government of Guinea
List